The Jethro Wood House is a historic house on Poplar Ridge Road, in a rural area west of the hamlet of Poplar Ridge in the town of Ledyard, New York.  Built by 1800, it was the home of inventor Jethro Wood (1774-1834), whose 1819 invention of an iron moldboard plow revolutionized American agriculture.  The house was declared a National Historic Landmark in 1964.  It is a private residence, and is not normally open to the public.

Description and history
The Jethro Wood House is located on the south side of Poplar Ridge Road, west of the village center of Poplar Ridge in Ledyard, New York.  It is a large -story wood-frame structure, with a gabled roof and clapboarded exterior.  It has a five-bay front facade, with sash windows arranged symmetrically around the main entrance.  The entrance is sheltered by a gable-roof portico supported by metal fixtures, and is framed by sidelight and transom windows.

The house was purchased about 1800 by Jethro Wood, who grew up in Washington County, New York and engaged in farming when he moved here.  In 1814 he was granted the first patent for a cast-iron plow with replaceable parts, improving on extant single-piece plows.  This first effort was not a commercial success, but in 1819 he was awarded a second patent which was.  His improvements made it possible for farmers to more rapidly prepare land for planting, enabling them to work more land.

Jethro Wood was also the area's first postmaster. His wife, Sylvia Howland, was the aunt of Emily Howland, an active abolitionist, philanthropist, and educator.  He spent his earnings fighting patent infringements. When he died in 1834, his children tried in vain to carry on his efforts at obtaining a renewed patent.

Current owners Thomas Hoppel and his partner extensively renovated in 2020 both inside and out and have added a porch to resemble a previous addition in the back of the house.

Gallery

See also
List of National Historic Landmarks in New York
National Register of Historic Places listings in Cayuga County, New York

References

External links
 The Cast Iron Plough

Houses on the National Register of Historic Places in New York (state)
National Historic Landmarks in New York (state)
Houses in Cayuga County, New York
National Register of Historic Places in Cayuga County, New York